The Agréable ("pleasant") was a 56-gun ship of the line of the French Navy.

She was built in 1670 as Glorieux ("Glorious") and renamed to Agréable in January 1675.

In 1700, she departed France for India in order to ferry a load of gold back to France. In 1701, Agréable, along with the Aurore, Mutine and Saint-Louis, were attacked off Île Bourbon. Damaged, the Agréable made repairs at Île Bourbon, where the treasure was hidden.

In 1711, Agréable was converted to a hulk, and she was eventually scrapped in 1717.

External links 

 Le trésor du capitaine Fontenay de Montreuil 
  VAISSEAUX DE LIGNE FRANÇAIS DE 1682 À 1767

Agreeable